This is a list of beaches in the Kingdom of Bahrain. Bahrain is an island and private beaches are abundant. Bahrain is a popular destination with tourists in the GCC.

Public Beaches

Manama Corniche
Sitra Beach near the Sitra lagoon.
Bahrain Al Beach
Bahrain Amwaj Beach
Bahrain Arad Fort Beach
Bahrain Hidd Beach
Bahrain Jazair Beach
Bahrain Karbabad Beach   Private Beaches
Solymar Beach Amwaj Island
Bahrain Ritz Carlton Beach
Bahrain Coral Bay Beach
Novotel Bahrain Al Dana Resort Beach
Bahrain Hawar Islands Beach
Bahrain Jarada Island Beach
Sofitel Bahrain Zallaq Thalassa Beach Sea & Spa

Southern Bahrain
Bapco Beach
Sanabis Beach
Zallaq Beach

Hawar Islands
Hawar Islands beach and resorts

See also
 List of beaches

References

Bahrain
Beaches
Beaches